Manuma Samoa is a professional rugby union team based in Samoa that plays in the Global Rapid Rugby competition. Founded in 2019 as Kagifa Samoa, the team is backed by the Samoa Rugby Union.

Name and logo
Manuma, in Samoan, refers to the many-colored fruit dove (Ptilinopus perousii), a small dove found in that country. The team logo includes the head of a manuma bird in profile beneath the Southern Cross in white on a blue background.

History

Kagifa Samoa
The Kagifa Samoa team was established in 2019 and competed in the Pacific Showcase series during the inaugural year of Global Rapid Rugby. In Samoan colloquial speech, a kagifa refers to an enormous wild fish or shark that wreaked havoc in Polynesian mythical legend, and which is more formally referred to as tanifa.

The team was backed by Pacific Sports International in partnership with the Samoa Rugby Union. The 2019 squad included Samoan-based players, Tongans, Fijians and New Zealanders as well as Samoan-eligible players based in Australia and New Zealand.

Manuma Samoa
The team was renamed Manuma Samoa with the backing of the Samoa Rugby Union for the 2020 Rapid Rugby season.

Home field
Manuma Samoa plays home games at Apia Park Stadium. Due to construction at Apia Park in 2019 for the Pacific Games, the team's home matches for the Rapid Rugby Pacific Showcase were moved to Pukekohe Stadium in Auckland and Ballymore Stadium in Brisbane.

Squad
The Manuma squad for the 2020 Global Rapid Rugby season:

Records

Season standings
Global Rapid Rugby

Notes:
 2019 Rapid Rugby matches in the Pacific showcase.

Head coaches
 Darryl Suasua (2019)
 Brian Lima (2020)

Captains
 Leon Fukofuka (2019)
 Patrick Fa’apale (2020)

See also

Rugby union in Samoa

References

External links
 Invest Samoa Manuma page
 Manu Samoa website of the Samoa Rugby Union

Archives
 
 

Samoan rugby union teams
Global Rapid Rugby teams
Rugby clubs established in 2019
Rugby union clubs disestablished in 2020
2020 disestablishments in Oceania